Harry Frank (15 October 1896 – 12 December 1947) was a German actor.

Selected filmography
 In den Goldfeldern von Nevada (1920)
 Das wandernde Bild (1920)
 The Wandering Image (1920)
 Four Around a Woman (1921)
 The Passion of Inge Krafft (1921)
 Marizza (1922)
 The Girl Without a Homeland (1927) 
 Escape from Hell (1928)
 The Case of Prosecutor M (1928)
 Give Me Life (1928)
 Mikosch Comes In (1928)
 Pawns of Passion (1928)
 Almenrausch and Edelweiss (1928)
 High Treason (1929)
 The Great Longing (1930)
 Rag Ball (1930)
 The Tiger Murder Case (1930)
 The Rhineland Girl (1930)
 Madame Bluebeard (1931)
 Kampf um Blond (1932)
 Wehe, wenn er losgelassen (1932)
 Life Begins Tomorrow (1933)
 The Hymn of Leuthen (1933)
 The Girlfriend of a Big Man (1934)
 What Am I Without You (1934)
 Everything for a Woman (1935)
 Black Fighter Johanna (1934)
 The Valiant Navigator (1935)
 Don't Lose Heart, Suzanne! (1935)
 The Night With the Emperor (1936)
 The Dreamer (1936)
 The Tiger of Eschnapur (1938)
 Raid (1947)

External links

1896 births
1947 deaths
German male film actors
German male silent film actors
Male actors from Berlin
20th-century German male actors